Bessais-le-Fromental is a commune in the Cher department in the Centre-Val de Loire region of France.

Geography
The commune shares its southern border with the department of Allier.

Population

Sights
 The church of St.Martin, dating from the eleventh century.
 A watermill.
 Traces of the ancient château de Lalan.
 Ruins of the medieval town of Venou.

See also
Communes of the Cher department

References

External links

Llama Trekking

Communes of Cher (department)